Felix Girard (born May 9, 1994) is a Canadian professional ice hockey forward. He is currently playing with IF Björklöven of the HockeyAllsvenskan (Allsv). Girard was selected by the Nashville Predators in the 4th round (95th overall) of the 2013 NHL Entry Draft.

Playing career
Serving as the captain of the Baie-Comeau Drakkar since the 2012–13 season, Girard was selected as the QMJHL's best defensive forward for both the 2012–13 and 2013–14 seasons, becoming the only player to have won the Guy Carbonneau Trophy twice.

In the final year of his entry-level contract in the 2016–17 season, on January 13, 2017, Girard was traded to the Colorado Avalanche in exchange for Cody McLeod and was immediately assigned to AHL affiliate, the San Antonio Rampage. He immediately rediscovered his scoring touch with the Rampage, surpassing his totals with the Admirals in contributing with 7 goals and 20 points in 38 games.

Girard remained with the Rampage through the 2017–18 season, appearing in every game he was unable to eclipse his previous year in totalling just 18 points. On June 25, 2018, as an impending restricted free agent, Girard was not tendered a qualifying offer by the Avalanche.

As a free agent, Girard was unable to attain another NHL contract, opting to sign a one-year AHL contract with the Manitoba Moose, affiliate to the Winnipeg Jets, on July 4, 2018.

After two seasons in the ICE Hockey League, Girard continued his career abroad in agreeing to a one-year contract with Swedish second division club, IF Björklöven of the Allsvenskan, on July 6, 2021.

International play
Girard has competed internationally with Team Canada, winning a gold medal at the 2011 Ivan Hlinka Memorial Tournament and a bronze at the 2012 IIHF World U18 Championships. He was the final forward cut from Canada's roster for the 2014 World Junior Ice Hockey Championships.

Career statistics

Regular season and playoffs

International

Awards and honours

References

External links

1994 births
Living people
Adirondack Thunder players
Baie-Comeau Drakkar players
IF Björklöven players
Canadian ice hockey centres
Fehérvár AV19 players
French Quebecers
Ice hockey people from Quebec
HC TWK Innsbruck players
Manitoba Moose players
Milwaukee Admirals players
Nashville Predators draft picks
People from Lévis, Quebec
San Antonio Rampage players